Neocollyris albocyanescens is a species of ground beetle in the genus Neocollyris in the family Carabidae. It was described by Horn in 1912.

References

Albocyanescens, Neocollyris
Beetles described in 1912
Taxa named by Walther Horn